Aintharuviar River is a river flowing in the Tirunelveli district of the Indian state of Tamil Nadu.

See also
List of rivers of Tamil Nadu

References

Rivers of Tamil Nadu
Geography of Tirunelveli district
Rivers of India